Cawjeekelia is a genus of millipedes belonging to the family Paradoxosomatidae.

The species of this genus are found in Southeastern Asia.

Species:

Cawjeekelia fimbriata 
Cawjeekelia gloriosa 
Cawjeekelia iksana 
Cawjeekelia kanoi 
Cawjeekelia koreana 
Cawjeekelia nordenskioeldi 
Cawjeekelia nova 
Cawjeekelia pallida 
Cawjeekelia propria 
Cawjeekelia pyongana

References

Paradoxosomatidae